Bulaklak sa City Jail (Flowers of the City Jail) is a 1984 Filipino drama film written by Lualhati Bautista and directed by Mario O'Hara and it depicts the situation of women in the city jail.

The film stars Nora Aunor, Gina Alajar, Celia Rodriguez, Perla Bautista, Maya Valdez, Zenaida Amador, and Maritess Gutierrez as the women who were incarcerated inside the Manila City Jail due to their crimes they commit and the crimes that were framed by the others.

Synopsis

A pregnant woman is arrested for attempted murder is sent to the Manila City Jail where she meets several women with shocking pasts.

Cast

Nora Aunor as Angela Aguilar
Gina Alajar as Juliet
Celia Rodriguez as Luna
Perla Bautista as Viring
Maya Valdez as Barbie
 Zenaida Amador as Tonya
 Maritess Gutierrez as Patricia
Gloria Romero as Patricia's mother
Ricky Davao as Crisanto
German Moreno as Warden Ambrocio
Bella Flores as Olga Bella
Shyr Valdez as Yolly
Tom Olivar as Paquito
Augusto Victa as Warden Esteban
Alvin Enriquez as Juliet's son
Toby Alejar as Mike
Gigette Reyes as Adela
Mandy Bustamante as Leon
Romy Nario as Totoy
Carmen Enriquez as Atty. Jacob
Cris Daluz as Atty. Diaz
Sarah Gayotin as Viring's daughter
Edwin O'Hara as Fr. Eusebio

Production staff

 Director: Mario O'Hara
 Producer: Archie and Cherry Cobarubbias
 Writer: Lualhati Bautista (story and screenplay)
 Production Designer: Tony Aguilar
 Art Director: Jon Jon Portugal
 Assistant Director: Ricardo B. De Guzman and Jon Jon Portugal
 Sound Effects: Rodel Capule
 Sound Mixer: Vic Macamay
 Music: Tony Aguilar
 Film Editor: Efren Jarlego
 Cinematographer: Johnny Araojo
 Post-Production Facilities: Magnatech Omni
 Color Processing: LVN Pictures
 Production-in-Charge: Pearl Valdez
 Production Managers: Maritess Gutierrez and Andy Biag

Release 
The film was released by Cherubim Films on December 25, 1984, and it is one of the following entries for the 1984 Metro Manila Film Festival. It won six awards including Best Picture, Best Actress and Best Director.

Digital restoration
The restored version of the film was premiered on November 11, 2019, at the Ayala Malls Manila Bay in Parañaque City as part of the Cinema One Originals film festival. It was attended by the film's surviving cast and staff members: actors Ricky Davao and Tom Olivar, film producer Cherry Cobarubbias and former actress and now chef Maritess Gutierrez (she also represented her mother Gloria Romero) as well as the staff and crew of the ABS-CBN Film Archives and the channel head of Cinema One, Ronald Arguelles. Actress Pinky Amador (niece of the late Zenaida Amador, who died in 2008), actress-producer Ruby Flores-Arcilla (daughter of Bella Flores, who died in 2013), and director Denise O'Hara (niece of Mario O'Hara, who died in 2012) also attended the premiere as the representatives of the cast and staff members who were deceased or unable to attend.

Reception 
In a review by Engelbert Rafferty for Film Police Reviews, the film is considered "a classic, no questions asked". Lualhati Bautista, the film's writer, was praised for the screenplay that made it alive and fascinated by the viewers as well as the exhibited dramatic performances of the cast members. Nora Aunor was also praised for her widely accepted and realized performance as Angela, whose character was described as "a woman maltreated by society".

Awards and recognition

References

External links 
 

1984 films
Filipino-language films
Philippine drama films
1984 drama films
Films directed by Mario O'Hara